The Officers' Ward may refer to:

 The Officers' Ward (novel)
 The Officers' Ward (film)